Canada competed in the 2014 Commonwealth Games in Glasgow, Scotland from July 23 to August 3, 2014. It was the nation's 20th appearance at the Commonwealth Games, having competed at every Games since their inception in 1930. Canada competed in 16 out of 17 sports with the only exception being netball (as the team did not qualify). Canada's team consisted of 265 athletes and 100 support staff, the largest team for a games not hosted by the country. On September 12, 2012 former Commonwealth Games medalist Chantal Petitclerc was named as the Chef de mission of the team, marking the first time a former para athlete was named to the post.

Former multiple medal winning Commonwealth Games and sport shooter Susan Nattrass was named as the team's opening ceremony flagbearer in June.

Canada finished the games winning a total of 32 gold medals and 82 medals in total. The result pushed Canada back into the top three, after finishing fourth four years ago in New Delhi.

Medalists

|  style="text-align:left; vertical-align:top;"|

|  style="text-align:left; vertical-align:top;"|

* – Indicates the athlete competed in preliminaries but not the final

Athletics

On June 4, 2014 Athletics Canada nominated fifty athletes to the team. Two athletes Alysha Newman (ranked second in the Commonwealth) and James Steacy (ranked first) did not meet the qualification standard but were still nominated to the team. All other athletes met the qualification standard for their events. The team finished the games with a total medal count of seventeen medals, including five gold. The seventeen medals represents a tie for the most medals won by the country in the sport at the Commonwealth Games.

Men

Field events

Combined events – Decathlon

Women

Field events

Combined events – Heptathlon

Badminton

On May 8, 2014, Badminton Canada named a team of eight athletes. The team won one medal, a gold by Michelle Li. The medal was the first individual badminton title for Canada at the Commonwealth Games.

Singles

Doubles

Mixed team

Pool D

Quarterfinals

Boxing

On June 11, 2014 Boxing Canada named its team of five male and two female athletes. The team finished with three medals, including one gold. Both women on the team won medals. The result marked an improvement of zero medals being won in 2010.

Cycling

On June 6, 2014, Cycling Canada named its team of sixteen athletes. On June 26, 2014, Cycling Canada added a further two athletes (for a total of 18) after Commonwealth Games Canada notified the organization they would be able to do, provided they were medal contenders. The athletes added are former World Championship medalist Svein Tuft and Will Routley. Canada's cycling team won a total of three medals: two in mountain biking and one in track cycling. The road cycling team won no medals.

Mountain biking

Road
Men

Women

Track

Keirin

Points Race

Pursuit

Scratch

Sprint

Team sprint

Time trial

Diving

On June 17, 2014, Diving Canada nominated eleven athletes to the team. Canadian divers finished the Games with seven medals one less than four years ago.

Men

Women

Field hockey

Men's tournament

On July 2, 2014 Field Hockey Canada nominated 16 athletes to the team. The team finished in sixth place, tying it for the highest placement with the 2006 team.

Roster

 David Carter
 Taylor Curran
 Adam Froese
 Matthew Guest
 Richard Hildreth
 Gabriel Ho-Garcia
 David Jameson
 Gordon Johnston
 Benjamin Martin
 Sukhpal Panesar
 Mark Pearson
 Keegan Pereira
 Iain Smythe
 Scott Tupper (C)
 Paul Wharton
 Philip Wright

Pool B

Fifth place match

Women's tournament

On July 2, 2014 Field Hockey Canada nominated 16 athletes to the team. The women's team finished the tournament in eighth place out of ten teams.

Roster

 Jessica Barnett
 Thea Culley
 Kate Gillis (C)
 Hannah Haughn
 Danielle Hennig
 Karli Johansen
 Lauren Logush
 Sara McManus
 Abigail Raye
 Ponam Sandhu
 Maddie Secco
 Brienne Stairs
 Holly Stewart
 Kaelan Watson
 Kaitlyn Williams
 Kristine Wishart

Pool A

Seventh place match

Gymnastics

On June 18, 2014, Gymnastics Canada nominated thirteen athletes to the team.

Artistic
The artistic team won a total of nine medals, three of each colour.
Men

Individual finals

Women

Individual all around final

Individual finals

Rhythmic
The rhythmic team finished the games with a total of six medals. Patricia Bezzoubenko's six medals meant she won the most medals by an individual athlete at the games.
Team

Individual

Individual finals

Judo

On June 6, 2014, Judo Canada nominated eleven athletes to the team. The team selected consists of current or past National Junior Champions who have been selected based on their current international experience and the promise of strong performances in the senior level. Thus the team selected does not consist of the top level athletes such as 2012 Olympic bronze medalist Antoine Valois-Fortier. The judo team finished the competition with a total of three bronze medals.

Men

Women

Lawn bowls

On April 17, 2014, Bowls Canada Boulingrin named a team of 14 athletes to the team. Ryan Bester won the country's only medal (a silver) in the men's singles competition. The medal was the country's first since 2006.

Men

Women

Para

Rugby sevens

Canada qualified a rugby sevens team. The roster was officially announced on July 8 by Rugby Canada. After losing two of three group stage games, Canada won the bowl competition. By winning the bowl, the team finished in a rank of ninth place overall.

Roster

 Connor Braid
 Justin Douglas
 Sean Duke
 Mike Fuailefau
 Lucas Hammond
 Ciaran Hearn
 Nathan Hirayama
 Harry Jones
 John Moonlight
 Mike Scholz
 Conor Trainor
 Sean White

Pool A

Bowl
Quarterfinals

Semifinal

Final

Finished in 9th place

Shooting

On July 7, 2014, Shooting Canada nominated 16 athletes to the team. Canada's shooting team won three medals, tying the result from four years prior.

Men

Women

Open

Squash

On May 28, 2014, Squash Canada named two athletes to the team. Canada's squash team did not manage to win a medal at the games, the only individual sport without a medalist.

Individual

Doubles

Swimming

On April 8, 2014, Swimming Canada announced a team of 33 swimmers. Swimmer Alec Page was later removed from the team due to a doping violation, reducing the team to 32 swimmers. Canada's team won a total of eleven medals, one more than four year ago at the 2010 Commonwealth Games.

Men

* Swam in the heats only.
 Ryan Cochrane finished in equal eighth position in the heats alongside England's Nick Grainger and Ieuan Lloyd from Wales. A swim-off was held between the three competitors which Grainger won and was awarded with the eighth and last qualification place in to the final.

Women

* Swam in the heats only.

Table tennis

On July 9, 2014, Table Tennis Canada nominated six athletes to the squad. The women's doubles duo of Anqi Luo and Zhang Mo won a bronze, the only medal won by the team.

Individual

Doubles

Team

Triathlon

On May 28, 2014, Triathlon Canada named a group of six athletes to the team. Kirsten Sweetland won the only medal by Canada in the sport. Her medal was the first medal the country won at the games.

Mixed

Weightlifting

On June 24, 2014, The Canadian Weightlifting Federation nominated fourteen athletes to the team. Canada's team won a total of four medals (two gold and two bronze).

Men

Women

Wrestling

On June 13, 2014 Wrestling Canada Lutte nominated fourteen athletes to the team. Canada's wrestling team won a total of twelve medals, including seven gold. The twelve medals is the highest won by the country in freestyle wrestling at the Commonwealth Games.

Men's freestyle

Women's freestyle

References

Nations at the 2014 Commonwealth Games
Canada at the Commonwealth Games
2014 in Canadian sports